The name Manuel was used for four tropical cyclones in the Eastern Pacific Ocean.
 Hurricane Manuel (1983) – never made landfall
 Tropical Storm Manuel (1989) – paralleled the coast of Mexico; never made landfall
 Tropical Storm Manuel (2001) – formed from the remnants of Hurricane Iris
 Hurricane Manuel (2013) – costliest Pacific hurricane on record; made landfall twice in Mexico (Colima, Sinaloa); killed at least 169 people

After the 2013 storm, the name Manuel was retired and replaced with Mario for the 2019 season.

Pacific hurricane set index articles